Parkview Baptist School (PBS) is a private K-12 Christian school located in Baton Rouge, Louisiana, United States.

Overview
With 1,260 students, Parkview Baptist School is the largest private school in Louisiana. The school began with students from kindergarten to sixth grade in 1981, adding grades 7–12 in 1983.   PBS is now divided into three administrative units: Parkview Baptist Elementary School (K-4), Parkview Baptist Middle School (5-8), and Parkview Baptist High School (9-12). Grade 5 was moved to be part of the middle school in fall 2008.

In 1981, the school was founded by members of the Parkview Baptist Church. The school and church were integrated into one core entity, but both maintain control of individual issues.

Parkview is governed by a school board that consists of appointed members from the school, church, and community.

Accreditation
Parkview Baptist School is certified by the Louisiana State Board of Elementary and Secondary Education as an approved K-12 education program. PBS is also accredited with the Southern Association of Colleges and Schools (SACS).  It is one of only 345 other independent schools in 11 states having this dual accreditation.  The school has also been approved to receive foreign students by the United States Immigration and Naturalization Services.

Athletics
Parkview Baptist High athletics competes in the LHSAA.

Championships
Football championships
(5) State Championships: 2001, 2007, 2010, 2012, 2015

Notable alumni
 Darry Beckwith, former NFL and CFL linebacker, graduated in 2005
 Shelley Regner, actress, Pitch Perfect and Pitch Perfect 2
 Brad Wing, NFL punter for the New York Giants, graduated in 2010

References

External links 
 Parkview Baptist School website

Baptist schools in the United States
Christian schools in Louisiana
Private high schools in Louisiana
Private middle schools in Louisiana
Private elementary schools in Louisiana
Schools in Baton Rouge, Louisiana